Borderland State Park is an American history and nature preserve with public recreational features located in the towns of Easton and Sharon, Massachusetts. The state park encompasses  surrounding the Ames Mansion, which was built in 1910. The area was listed on the National Register of Historic Places as Borderland Historic District in 1997. It is operated by the Massachusetts Department of Conservation and Recreation, with an appointed advisory council that participates in policy decision-making.

History
In 1906, Oakes Ames, a Harvard botanist (son of Massachusetts governor Oliver Ames and grandson of U.S. Representative Oakes Ames), and his wife Blanche Ames Ames (daughter of Mississippi governor Adelbert Ames, but not related to Oakes Ames), an artist and feminist, purchased land on the border of Sharon and Easton. There they built a mansion that includes Blanche Ames' studio, which still stands and created a nature preserve with woodland paths and roadways and man-made ponds. The family's home, a three-story, 20-room stone mansion constructed in 1910, was built largely at the direction of Blanche Ames. Her paintings still hang on the walls and much of the original furnishings are still intact. After it remained in the family for 65 years, the Commonwealth of Massachusetts acquired the Borderland estate in 1971, two years after the death of Blanche Ames, and opened it as a state park.

Activities and amenities
Trails include a portion of the Bay Circuit Trail and the Quarry Loop to Moyles Quarry which supplied the facing stone for the Canton Viaduct in 1835. The park features mansion tours, a visitors center, pond fishing and canoeing, ice skating, sledding, and disc golf. Mansion tours are typically held on Sundays during the months of April through May. The mansion is typically not open to the public other than during these tours, and for special events.

Borderland is the home course for Oliver Ames High School cross country team. Until 2014, it was the site of the Hockomock League Cross Country championship race. It is also utilized by the Old Colony League for its annual cross country meet and various invitational meets on the  course, and was the site of the World Masters Flying Disc Championships in 1996.

In popular culture
The park has been used in a commercial, a documentary, and the film Mermaids. Scenes from the Martin Scorsese movie Shutter Island were shot at the stone lodge next to Leach Pond in 2008. Ames Mansion interiors were used as a filming location for Ghostbusters in 2015. A fictionalized version of the park is featured in the novel Disappearance at Devil's Rock by Paul Tremblay. Interiors, particularly the library, were featured in the 2019 Rian Johnson film Knives Out as the home of mystery writer and murder victim Harlan Thrombey.  Production designer David Crank stated, “The general rule was that both the inside and outside of the house needed to look like the sort of house that Harlan would describe in one of his mysteries. The moment we walked into the mansion we knew right away that it had the personality we needed.”

Parking
Borderland charges a $5 day use fee ($20 for out of state visitors) which can be purchased in the main lot. Season passes can also be purchased. Note that the machines no longer take cash as a form of payment.

The primary parking lot is located near 259 Massapoag Ave, in North Easton, MA. Alternate parking can be found by the intersection of Mansfield St. and Massapoag Ave in Sharon, MA, as well as at various locations on Mountain Street in North Easton, MA.

Gallery

See also

National Register of Historic Places listings in Norfolk County, Massachusetts
National Register of Historic Places listings in Bristol County, Massachusetts

References

Further reading
 Behrens, Roy R., "The Artistic and Scientific Collaboration of Blanche Ames Ames and Adelbert Ames II," Leonardo Journal 31.1 (1998): 47-54.

External links
Borderland State Park Department of Conservation and Recreation
Borderland State Park Map Department of Conservation and Recreation
Friends of Borderland

State parks of Massachusetts
Bay Circuit Trail
Massachusetts natural resources
Sports in Bristol County, Massachusetts
Sports in Norfolk County, Massachusetts
Historic districts in Norfolk County, Massachusetts
Historic districts in Bristol County, Massachusetts
Parks in Bristol County, Massachusetts
Parks in Norfolk County, Massachusetts
Sharon, Massachusetts
Easton, Massachusetts
Houses completed in 1910
Historic house museums in Massachusetts
Protected areas established in 1971
National Register of Historic Places in Norfolk County, Massachusetts
National Register of Historic Places in Bristol County, Massachusetts
Historic districts on the National Register of Historic Places in Massachusetts
Butler–Ames family
1971 establishments in Massachusetts